Tillandsia jaliscopinicola is a plant species in the genus Tillandsia. This species is endemic to Mexico.

References

jalisco-pinicola
Endemic flora of Mexico
Flora of Jalisco